Brian Joseph Hernandez Jr. (born November 3, 1985, in Lafayette, Louisiana) is an American Eclipse Award-winning jockey in Thoroughbred horse racing. He began riding professionally in 2003 and got his first win on November 29 of that year at Louisiana's Delta Downs.

In 2004, Hernandez won 243 races and was voted the Eclipse Award for Outstanding Apprentice Jockey. In 2009 he rode Rachel Alexandra to two wins in her first five starts.

Year-end charts

References

External links
 Photo of Hernandez winning on Rachel Alexandra

1985 births
American jockeys
Eclipse Award winners
Living people
Sportspeople from Lafayette, Louisiana